Belvedere is a census-designated place (CDP) and suburb of North Augusta in Aiken County, South Carolina, United States. It is part of the Augusta, Georgia metropolitan area. The population was 5,792 at the 2010 census.

Belvedere (from Italian, meaning "beautiful sight") was so named for its scenic river views over the Savannah River.

Geography
Belvedere is located in western Aiken County at  (33.531985, -81.943338). It is surrounded by the city of North Augusta, though Belvedere lies to the northeast of the original city center. U.S. Route 25 (Edgefield Road) is the main road through the community, leading north to Interstate 20 just outside the CDP. Interstate 520 passes just to the east of the CDP.

Highways

Demographics

2000 Census
As of the census of 2000, there were 5,631 people, 2,245 households, and 1,567 families residing in the CDP. The racial makeup of the CDP was 74.39% White, 23.64% African American, 0.09% Native American, 0.39% Asian, 0.04% Pacific Islander, 0.52% from other races, and 0.94% from two or more races. Hispanic or Latino of any race were 1.81% of the population.

There were 2,245 households, out of which 32.0% had children under the age of 18 living with them, 52.9% were married couples living together, 13.4% had a female householder with no husband present, and 30.2% were non-families. 26.5% of all households were made up of individuals, and 10.5% had someone living alone who was 65 years of age or older. The average household size was 2.51 and the average family size was 3.02.

In the CDP, the population was spread out, with 25.4% under the age of 18, 8.8% from 18 to 24, 30.0% from 25 to 44, 22.9% from 45 to 64, and 12.8% who were 65 years of age or older. The median age was 36 years. For every 100 females, there were 91.9 males. For every 100 females age 18 and over, there were 88.3 males.

The median income for a household in the CDP was $36,045, and the median income for a family was $40,264. Males had a median income of $31,768 versus $21,374 for females. The per capita income for the CDP was $16,336. About 11.0% of families and 12.0% of the population were below the poverty line, including 15.3% of those under age 18 and 5.4% of those age 65 or over.

2010 Census
At the 2010 census, the total population was 5,792, of whom 0.31% were American Indian or Alaska native, 0.41% were Asian, 26.23% were African American, 0.05% were Native Hawaiian or other Pacific Islander, 66.80% were white, 3.63% were some other race, and 2.57% were of two or more races. People of Hispanic or Latino origin of any race made up 5.96% of the population. Males comprised 48.46%, and females 51.54% of the population.
 
Persons under the age of 5 were 7.63% of the population, persons age 5 to 17 were 17.37%, age 18 to 64 were 60.01%, and age 65 and over were 14.99% of the population.

2020 Census

As of the 2020 United States census, there were 5,380 people, 2,251 households, and 1,452 families residing in the CDP.

References

Census-designated places in Aiken County, South Carolina
Census-designated places in South Carolina
Augusta metropolitan area